SMS Hansa  was a German ironclad warship built in 1868–1875. She was the first ironclad built in Germany; all previous German ironclads had been built in foreign shipyards. She was named after the Hanseatic League, known in Germany simply as Hanse, Latinized Hansa. The ship was launched in October 1872 and commissioned into the German Imperial Navy (Kaiserliche Marine) in May 1875. Designed for overseas service, Hansa was classed as an armored corvette and armed with eight  guns in a central battery.

Hansa served abroad for the first nine years of her career in the German navy. In 1884, it was found that her iron hull was badly corroded, which rendered the ship unfit for further active service. She was therefore removed from active duty and used for a variety of secondary roles. From 1884 to 1888, she served as a guard ship in Kiel, where she also trained engine and boiler room personnel. In 1888, she was stricken from the naval register and used as a barracks ship in Kiel. She was moved to Mönkeberg in 1905, where she continued to train boiler room personnel, until 1906 when she was sold to ship-breakers and dismantled for scrap.

Design 
Development of a small armored corvette began in 1861, shortly after the first ironclad warships entered service in the British and French fleets. The Prussians initially envisioned using the armored vessel to reduce coastal fortifications, as the French ironclad floating batteries had done at the Battle of Kinburn in 1855. Work on the concept proceeded slowly, and the Prussians initially purchased as series of ironclads from British and French shipyards. The design evolved over this period, eventually settling on a casemate ship similar to the British Edward Reed-designed .

General characteristics and machinery 

The ship's hull was formed with transverse iron frames and mixed iron and timber construction. The underwater portion of the hull was plated with copper to reduce fouling. It contained six watertight compartments.

The German navy found the ship to be very stiff in her sea-keeping qualities. Steering was controlled by a single rudder. Hansa was very maneuverable and was easily controlled while under sail; under steam the ship remained highly maneuverable but control suffered. The ship's crew numbered 28 officers and 371 enlisted men. She carried a number of smaller boats aboard, including two launches, one pinnace, two cutters, one yawl, and one dinghy. The ship also carried an unknown number of picket boats and barges. Anti-torpedo nets were briefly fitted to the ship from 1885 to 1888.

Hansa was powered by a single horizontal three-cylinder single-expansion steam engine built by AG Vulcan in Stettin. The boilers were ducted into a single large funnel that could be retracted when the ship was operated under sail.

Armament and armor 

Hansa was armed with eight  L/19 hooped guns, each of which was provided with 110 rounds of ammunition. The guns were placed in a two-story arrangement amidships; four were mounted in a broadside casemate, two on either side of the ship. The other four guns were mounted in casemates on the corners of the lower casemate, which gave the ship a degree of end-on fire capability. The upper guns had a wider range of elevation; they could depress to −8° and elevate to 14°.

Hansas armor consisted of teak-backed wrought iron, which was manufactured in Great Britain. The casemates were armored with 114 mm thick sloping iron plates. The lower battery casemate had 114 mm thick transverse armored bulkheads on either end of the side armor.

Service history 

Hansa was laid down at the Royal Dockyard in Danzig in 1868. She was the first ironclad warship to be built in a German shipyard; her predecessors had all been built in French and British shipyards. The ship was launched on 26 October 1872 and moved to the AG Vulcan shipyard in Stettin for fitting out work in August 1873. This was completed in December 1874, and the ship was then towed to Kiel on 3 January 1875, where she was taken into a floating dry dock for final fitting-out. Hansa was finally commissioned into the German fleet on 19 May, two and a half years after her launch. By comparison, all of the earlier foreign-built ironclads were completed in less than a year after their launching; the delays with Hansa were largely the result of the inexperience of the shipyards with building ironclad warships.

Through the 1870s, the German armored fleet typically saw active service during the summer months. Over the winter, most of the vessels were placed in reserve with one or two kept in a state of reduced commission as guard ships. The ships remained in German waters and Hansa was again decommissioned following the end of the cruise in late summer. She remained out of commission until July 1878 when she returned to service for a deployment to the West Indies later that year. She arrived in the area in January 1879 and toured various ports; later that year she moved to South America to protect German nationals during the War of the Pacific between Peru, Chile, and Bolivia. She stopped in Brazil on the way before arriving in Callao, Peru on 8 September. She cruised off the Peruvian and Chilean coast through June 1880.

Having returned to Germany in late 1880, she was decommissioned in November for a refit that lasted until February 1884. It was found that her hull was badly corroded; this stemmed from the lengthy construction period, during which the iron had already begun to corrode. As a result of the poor shape of her hull, Hansa was removed from active service in 1884 and used as a guard ship in Kiel. She nevertheless joined the training squadron in 1885, along with Friedrich Carl and the new ironclad . She remained in active service the following year, assigned to II Division of the training squadron, along with four screw corvettes. While in Kiel, she was also used as a training ship for engine-room personnel and stokers. She was activated in June 1887 for the ceremonies marking the beginning of work on the Kaiser Wilhelm Canal that was to link Kiel on the Baltic Sea with the North Sea. She was formally stricken from the naval register on 6 August 1888, by which time her hull had deteriorated further and she was no longer capable of going to sea. She was then used as a floating barracks in Kiel, until 1905. Hansa was then moved to Mönkeberg, hulked, and used to train stokers. The ship did not last long in this service, and was sold in March 1906 for 96,000 marks. Hansa was broken up later that year in Swinemünde.

Footnotes

Notes

Citations

References 

 
 
 
 

1872 ships
19th-century frigates of Germany
Ironclad warships of the Imperial German Navy
Ships built in Danzig